HMNZS Gale (T04) was a coastal cargo boat which was requisitioned by the Royal New Zealand Navy (RNZN) and converted into a minesweeper. She was the first New Zealand vessel to go into action against Japan.

Gale was owned by the Canterbury Steam Shipping Company. She was taken over on 10 October 1940 and handed to the dockyard for conversion.

Operational history
Gale joined the 25th Minesweeping Flotilla in April 1941, sweeping for German mines in the Hauraki Gulf. On 14 May, she rescued the survivors of the Puriri sinking. Later in 1941, the flotilla swept suspected minefield areas such as near Cuvier Island and Farewell Spit. In December 1941 Gale detached to relieve  in Fiji. She returned to New Zealand for refit in February 1942.

In June 1942, Gale was deployed to Noumea for port minesweeping duties where she was the first New Zealand vessel to deploy with COMSOPAC, the United States Navy's South Pacific Command, then taking over command of the 25th Minesweeping Flotilla. On 5 August, Gale located a missing US amphibious aircraft, rescued the crew, and towed it back to Noumea. The ship subsequently received a US commendation. Gale sailed back to New Zealand on 30 October 1942; she was then assigned to Wellington as a port minesweeper with the Second Minesweeping Group.

In February 1943, Gale rejoined the 25th Minesweeping Flotilla at Tulagi in the Solomons. In April 1943, her sister ship Breeze arrived at Tulagi, at which point Gale, Breeze and Matai were formed into the 9th Auxiliary Minesweeping group. They carried out night-time patrol and escort duties under COMSOPAC control. The Japanese were largely well to the north by this time, but occasionally made sudden attacks into American strongholds around Guadalcanal.

From time to time flotilla boats would return to Auckland for refit, usually escorting freighters bound the same way. By mid-1944, the owners were demanding the return of Gale and her twin Breeze. COMSOPAC released her on 20 September 1944.

Fate
Gale was sold by Canterbury Steam Shipping Company in December 1962 to Cia de Transportes Sylvia S.A. of Panama and renamed Jasa. She was scrapped in Singapore in 1970.

See also
Minesweepers of the Royal New Zealand Navy

References

 McDougall, R. J.  (1989) New Zealand Naval Vessels. Page 69-78. Government Printing Office.

Further reading
 Harker, Jack (2000)The Rockies: New Zealand Minesweepers at War. Silver Owl Press. 

Gale-class minesweepers
1935 ships
Ships built on the River Clyde